The 29th Goya Awards were presented at the Madrid Marriott Auditorium Hotel in Madrid on February 7, 2015 to honour the best in Spanish films of 2014. Actor and comedian Dani Rovira was the master of ceremonies. Nominees were announced on January 7, 2015. Marshland won ten awards, including Best Film, Best Director, Best Original Screenplay, and Best Actor.

Winners and nominees

Major awards

Other award nominees

Honorary Goya
Antonio Banderas

References

External links
Official site

29
2014 film awards
2014 in Spanish cinema
2015 in Madrid